The Serie B 1937–38 was the ninth tournament of this competition played in Italy since its creation.

Teams
Sanremese, Vigevano, Padova, Anconitana and Taranto had been promoted from Serie C, while Novara and Alessandria had been relegated from Serie A.

Events
The league was expanded to seventeen clubs to allow a wider representation of Southern Italy.

Final classification

Results

Promotion tie-breaker

The match Modena-Novara was not played because it wouldn't have influenced the verdict. Modena and Novara were both awarded champions and promoted to Serie A.

References and sources
Almanacco Illustrato del Calcio - La Storia 1898-2004, Panini Edizioni, Modena, September 2005

1937–38
2
Italy